Nagana is a 1933 American pre-Code drama film directed by Ernst L. Frank and written by Don Ryan and Dale Van Every. The film stars Tala Birell, Melvyn Douglas, Miki Morita, Onslow Stevens, Everett Brown and Billy McClain. The film was released on February 1, 1933, by Universal Pictures.

Plot
According to the British Film Institute, Nagana is the “story of a white doctor's struggle against fearful odds to discover a cure for sleeping sickness.”

Cast 
Tala Birell as Countess Sandra Lubeska
Melvyn Douglas as Dr. Walter Tradnor
Miki Morita as Dr. Kabayochi
Onslow Stevens as Dr. Roy Stark
Everett Brown as Nogu
Billy McClain as The King
William R. Dunn as Mukovo
Frank Lackteen as Ivory Trader
Noble Johnson as Head Boatman

References

External links 
 

1933 films
American drama films
1933 drama films
Universal Pictures films
American black-and-white films
1930s English-language films
1930s American films
English-language drama films